Lorenzo Smith (born May 23, 1972) is an American singer-songwriter who has released three albums.

Biography

Lorenzo Smith was born on May 23, 1972, in Havana, Florida. As a child, he sang in the churches and was an avid listener of Michael Jackson, El Debarge, James Brown and Sam Cooke. In high school, Lorenzo was active and competed in sports, a fact reflected by his strong build.

In 1990, Lorenzo put out his first album, Let Me Show You. The album was released with Alpha International through CEMA Records. The album's title track reached No. 64 on the R&B charts, while the album's other single "Tic Tok" reached No. 41.

On Lorenzo's eponymous sophomore effort, the song "Real Love" reached No. 6 on the R&B charts; followed up with "Make Love 2 Me" and "I Can't Stand The Pain." which reached No. 21 and No. 22 on the R&B charts, respectively.

Lorenzo released his last album to date in 1995, after a three-year dispute with Alpha International. The album, Love on My Mind, was released on Luke Campbell's Luke Records. It had one charting single, "If It's Alright With You" which reached No. 41 on the R&B charts.

As of 2015, Smith continues to perform and featured on the single "I Know (No More)" by Razor.

Discography
 Let Me Show You (Alpha International/Capitol, 1990)
 Lorenzo (Alpha International/Polydor, 1992)
 Love on My Mind (Luke, 1995)

References

1972 births
Living people
20th-century American singers
21st-century American singers
20th-century African-American male singers
American contemporary R&B singers
American rhythm and blues singer-songwriters
People from Gadsden County, Florida
Singer-songwriters from Florida
20th-century American male singers
21st-century American male singers
African-American songwriters
21st-century African-American male singers
American male singer-songwriters